The 2003 WNBA season was the 1st season for the franchise in San Antonio and the 7th season in the league as a franchise.

Offseason

Dispersal Draft

WNBA Draft

Regular season

Season Schedule

Season standings

Player stats
Note: GP= Games played; REB= Rebounds; AST= Assists; STL = Steals; BLK = Blocks; PTS = Points; AVG = Average

Awards and honors

References 

San Antonio Stars seasons
San Antonio